Florentino Jorge Wehbe (1920 – November 4, 1998) was an Argentine lawyer and economist who served as Minister of Economy of Argentina for one year.

Minister of Economy

Wehbe was director at the Bank of the Province of Buenos Aires in 1955. He was Minister of Economy (August 25, 1982 – December 10, 1983) during the presidency of General Reynaldo Bignone. 

His most notable achievement was negotiating the debt of Argentina, during which he made numerous trips to the United States.

References

University of Buenos Aires alumni
People from Río Cuarto, Córdoba
1920 births
1998 deaths
Argentine Ministers of Finance
Argentine people of Lebanese descent
20th-century  Argentine economists
20th-century Argentine lawyers